Alexandros Katranis (born 4 May 1998) is a Greek professional footballer who plays as a left-back for Ekstraklasa club Piast Gliwice.

Career

Atromitos
Katranis made his professional debut in the Super League for Atromitos on 25 September 2016 in a game against Asteras Tripolis. According to "footballscout24.it" website, was the only Greek player to feature on a list entitled “TOP 40 young talent in world football – born in 1998″.

Saint-Étienne
In August 2017, Ligue 1 side Saint-Étienne announced the signing of Katranis on a five-year contract. The transfer fee paid to Atromitos was reported as €800,000 plus as 15% re-sale clause in case of a future transfer. He didn't play a single game with the first team as the jump of 14 games in the Super League, in a mid-table club, in a top French club as Saint-Étienne, is a very big gap.

Loan to Royal Mouscron
On 21 June 2018, he signed a long season contract with Belgian club Royal Excel Mouscron on loan from Saint-Étienne.
At the end of the first round, it seems that it is not counted by the coach and former of the Olympiacos U21 team, Bernd Storck, for the second half of the season. After 8 appearances (7 of which in the starting squad) and 1 in the Belgian Cup, the young defender is expected to return to France. As Foot Sur 7 reported, the 20-year-old left-back has no place in  Royal Excel Mouscron and will return to St-Etienne despite the fact that the coach Jean-Louis Gasset, who did not trust Katranis at the beginning of the season and preferred to give him as a loanee.

Loan to Atromitos
On 22 January 2019, the return of the young international to Atromitos was officially finalized for a year and a half with a buy out option, while Katranis is intended as a replacement for Dimitris Giannoulis who returned to PAOK. On 1 August 2019, Atromitos reached the UEFA Europa League third qualifying round thanks to a thrilling 3–2 home win over Dunajska Streda at the Peristeri Stadium which gave the Athens club a 5–3 aggregate success. Katranis opened the score, as he picked up possession on the edge of the penalty area after the ball had deflected into his path. The 21-year-old defender showed great skill and turn of pace to skip past a couple of Dunajska challenges before slotting the ball confidently passed Martin Jedlička in the visiting goal. It was his first goal in European club competitions.

Loan to Hatayspor
On 27 August 2020, the 22-year-old Greek left-back Alexandros Katranis has been sent by Ligue 1 club Saint-Étienne on loan to Turkish Süper Lig side Hatayspor for the 2020–21 season. Under contract with Les Verts until June 2022, it is unclear whether or not there is an option to buy included in agreement.

On 18 August 2021, after four years in France and Saint-Étienne, Katranis mutually solved his contract with the club. Although the 23-year-old defender had an additional year contract with the French club, Saint-Étienne did not have him in their plans for this season either, while he himself was unhappy with the fact that he was not given any opportunity to play with the club and was loaned out three times.

Piast Gliwice
On 3 September 2021, Alexandros Katranis signed a three-year contract with Ekstraklasa club Piast Gliwice.

Career statistics

Club

References

External links

 
 

1998 births
Living people
Footballers from Volos
Association football defenders
Greek footballers
Greece under-21 international footballers
Greece youth international footballers
Atromitos F.C. players
AS Saint-Étienne players
Royal Excel Mouscron players
Hatayspor footballers
Piast Gliwice players
Super League Greece players
Ligue 1 players
Süper Lig players
Belgian Pro League players
Ekstraklasa players
Greek expatriate footballers
Greek expatriate sportspeople in France
Expatriate footballers in France
Greek expatriate sportspeople in Belgium
Expatriate footballers in Belgium
Greek expatriate sportspeople in Poland
Expatriate footballers in Poland